Burnie is a surname. Notable people with the surname include:

James Burnie (1882–1975), English businessman and politician
Robert Burnie (1842–1908), English politician
Stu Burnie (born 1962), Canadian ice hockey player

See also
Bernie (surname)